is a cave that lies to the west of Kumamoto, Japan, that became a temporary home to the legendary rōnin, Miyamoto Musashi. From 1643, Musashi spent many of his last months in the cave, meditating and writing his Book of Five Rings. The cave is accessed easily by bus from Kumamoto City and nearby Tamana.

Further reading
 
 
 
 
 
 

Landforms of Kumamoto Prefecture
Caves of Japan
Miyamoto Musashi